Digana is a village in Sri Lanka. It is located within Central Province, between Kandy and Teldeniya on A26 road. It is known for its dolomite mineral. Philanthropist Alhaji Azeez Muhammedh Rauf introduced dolomite to Sri Lanka. There are several dolomite industries in Digana.

After submerging Teldeniya, Digana became the popular alternative town to all neighbourhoods.
The population is around 2000 families living in a multi-ethnic community.

In March 2018, it was the site of mob attack causing communal violence against Muslim-owned homes, businesses, and at least one mosque, leading to the declaration of a state of emergency.

See also
List of towns in Central Province, Sri Lanka

External links

References

 Populated places in Central Province, Sri Lanka